Kelvin Patrick Joia Rodrigues Araujo (born 8 July 2000), known as Kelvin Patrick, is a Cape Verdean professional footballer who plays as a defensive midfielder.

Career 
On 5 August 2021, Patrick signed for Nancy in France. He made his debut for the club in a 1–0 Ligue 2 loss to Caen on 21 August.

References

External links 
 
 
 

2000 births

Living people
People from São Vicente, Cape Verde
Cape Verdean footballers
Association football midfielders
Batuque FC players
AS Nancy Lorraine players
Ligue 2 players
Cape Verdean expatriate footballers
Expatriate footballers in France
Cape Verdean expatriate sportspeople in France